Professor Pyarelal is an Indian situational comedy series which premiered on 12 August 1999 on Zee TV.

Overview

This is the story of an absent minded professor who, besides other things, even forgets his own name and address causing confusion in his family and neighbourhood. This story completely revolves around Professor Pyarelal and it shows that how due to his forgetful nature gets into a lot of problem which makes everybody laugh.

Cast
Ashok Saraf as Professor Pyarelal
Priya Tendulkar / Shoma Anand as Sajani
Rakhee Tandon as Kiran
Vishal Singh as Jackie

References

Zee TV original programming
Indian comedy television series
Indian television sitcoms
1999 Indian television series debuts